Marianela Salazar Guillén (born ), is a Panamanian model and beauty pageant contestant. She is the winner of the title Señorita Panamá-Miss Asia Pacific 1999 in the contest Señorita Panamá 1999 and first Runner-Up in the Miss Asia Pacific 2000.

She also competed in the Reinado Internacional del Café 2000 finishing as first runner-up celebrate in Manizales, Colombia.
The same year she competed in the Miss Mesoamerica 2000 contest finishing as second runner-up.

Contests
Señorita Panamá 1999
In 1999 participate in the Señorita Panamá contest, where she place in the second place, that is the relative of the title Señorita Panamá-Miss Asia Pacific 1999, contest winner for Analía Verónica Núñez Sagripanti who participate in the Miss Universe 2000.

Miss Asia Pacific 2000
In 2000 she participated in Miss Asia Pacific 2000, in  celebrate in Quezon City, Philippines, she won the best swimsuit competition and the final of the event the first runner-up position.

Today she is a well-known model  and TV Host in Panama; she currently lives in Panama City.

References

1970s births
Living people
Panamanian beauty pageant winners
Señorita Panamá